The Joseph D. and Margaret Kelly House is a historic residence in The Dalles, Oregon, United States. Joseph Kelly, a highly successful farmer during the establishment of wheat as a major cash crop in Wasco County, retired young to this 1908 blufftop house and continued his career as a landlord and businessman. He and his wife Margaret, a teacher and member of another important wheat family, became a prominent philanthropic figures in The Dalles. The house is architecturally notable for its vernacular rendering of the Queen Anne style, reflecting the Kellys' rural background in contrast to the high Victorian approach used elsewhere in The Dalles.

The house was added to the National Register of Historic Places in 1999.

See also
National Register of Historic Places listings in Wasco County, Oregon
Bennett–Williams House
Hugh Glenn House
John L. Thompson House

References

External links

Houses completed in 1908
1908 establishments in Oregon
Houses in The Dalles, Oregon
National Register of Historic Places in Wasco County, Oregon
Houses on the National Register of Historic Places in Oregon
Queen Anne architecture in Oregon